Do You Feel Me? is the second EP by American singer-songwriter Oliver Tree. It was released by Atlantic Records on August 2, 2019.

Track listing

Charts

References

2019 EPs
Oliver Tree albums